Gabino Antonio Espinoza Ruíz (born 17 January 1991) is a Mexican professional footballer who plays for Cimarrones de Sonora.

References

1991 births
Living people
Association football goalkeepers
Cimarrones de Sonora players
Ascenso MX players
Liga Premier de México players
Tercera División de México players
Footballers from Sonora
People from Magdalena de Kino
Mexican footballers